Calosoma aurocinctum is a species of ground beetle in the subfamily of Carabinae. It was described by Maximilien Chaudoir in 1950.

References

aurocinctum
Beetles described in 1950